Crown Street is a  street in the inner Sydney suburbs of Woolloomooloo, Darlinghurst and Surry Hills in New South Wales, Australia. The Surry Hills section is lined with restaurants and shops and includes the Crown Street Public School, the Surry Hills Library and Community Centre, and the White Horse Hotel.

Traffic volumes vary, depending on the segment of Crown Street. South of William Street in East Sydney, the average traffic movements in 2016 for north-bound vehicles was 5,690; while the movements for south-bound vehicles was 4,136.

History
An electric tram service formerly ran down Crown Street from Oxford Street to Cleveland Street until its closure in the late 1950s. Until the opening of the Eastern Distributor in December 1999, Crown Street was a one way street in a southerly direction south of Campbell Street.

The now-closed Crown Street Women's Hospital was once the largest maternity hospital in Sydney. It opened in 1893, and was closed in 1983. The site has now been redeveloped as housing and mixed commercial use.

The Crown Street pumping station was established in 1859 to get water from the Botany Water Reserves, replacing Busby's Bore. It also pumped water up to the Paddington Reservoir, then the Centennial Park Reservoir before also supplying Waverley.

See also

References

External links
 State records, NSW
 University of Sydney History

Streets in Sydney
Darlinghurst, New South Wales
Surry Hills, New South Wales